Carlo Legutti (29 November 1912 –1 March 1985) was an Italian cyclist. He competed in the tandem event at the 1936 Summer Olympics.

References

External links
 

1912 births
1985 deaths
Italian male cyclists
Olympic cyclists of Italy
Cyclists at the 1936 Summer Olympics
Place of birth missing